The people listed below were all born in, residents of, or otherwise closely associated with Kenosha, Wisconsin.

Artists, authors

 William Bast, screenwriter
 Chester Biscardi, composer, director of musical arts at Yale University
 Lucien Cailliet, composer, conductor, film orchestrator (The Ten Commandments)
 Jeff Cesario, comedian, TV writer
 Donald Clarke, author of books on musical subjects
 Korey Cooper, backup vocalist, keyboardist, rhythm guitarist for Skillet
 Anna Fermin, musician
 John Fumo, musician with Neil Young
 Tom Goss, musician
 Lionel Hampton, vibraphonist and bandleader
 Florence Parry Heide, author
 Milt Herth, organist
 Margaret Landon, author of Anna and the King of Siam (The King and I)
 Jen Ledger, drummer/singer for Skillet
 Gavin Lux, Major League Baseball infielder for the Los Angeles Dodgers
 Dave Matrise, singer, guitarist for Jungle Rot
 Lloyd John Ogilvie, Presbyterian minister and writer; served as Chaplain of the United States Senate
 Milton K. Ozaki, author and detective novelist
 George Pollard, portrait painter
 Thom Racina, author and screenwriter (General Hospital)
 Spike Robinson, jazz saxophonist
 Jim Rygiel, triple Academy Award winner (Lord of the Rings) 
 Mary Sauer, principal pianist for the Chicago Symphony Orchestra since 1959; on the piano faculty of DePaul University for 33 years, where she was coordinator of the keyboard program
 Will Schaefer, composer
 Edwin Stringham, composer, educator
 Kathie Sullivan, vocalist (The Lawrence Welk Show)
 Irving Wallace, author (The Chapman Report)

Actors/actresses, directors

 Don Ameche, actor, Academy Award-winner (Cocoon, Trading Places)
 Jim Ameche, actor (Jack Armstrong, the All-American Boy)
 Thom Bierdz, actor (The Young and the Restless)
 Francesco Bilotto, television personality (Good Morning America, The View, Today)
 Edward F. Cline, film director (The Bank Dick, You Can't Cheat an Honest Man)
 Scott Glenn, actor (The Silence of the Lambs, The Right Stuff, The Hunt for Red October)
 Bert I. Gordon, film director (The Food of the Gods)
 Al Molinaro, actor (Happy Days, The Odd Couple)
 Mark Ruffalo, actor (The Avengers, Avengers: Infinity War, Now You See Me, Shutter Island, Zodiac)
 Tony Russel, film and stage actor (Hearts Are Wild)
 Rebecca Scott, model and actress, Miss August 1999 for Playboy
 Charles Siebert, actor (Trapper John, M.D.), director (Xena: Warrior Princess)
 Paul Sorensen, actor (Dance With Me, Henry)
 John Stephenson, voice actor (Flintstones)
 Concetta Tomei, actress (China Beach)
 Daniel J. Travanti, actor (Hill Street Blues)
 Orson Welles, producer, actor, writer, director (Citizen Kane, The Magnificent Ambersons, Touch of Evil, F for Fake)

Politics and law

 Joseph F. Andrea, Wisconsin legislator
 John Martin Antaramian, Wisconsin legislator, current Mayor of Kenosha 
 Peter W. Barca, U.S. Representative and Wisconsin legislator
 Chauncey Davis, Michigan legislator
 C. Ernest Dewey, Wisconsin legislator
 Eugene Dorff, Wisconsin legislator and former Kenosha mayor
 Charles Durkee, U.S. Senator
 Asahel Farr, 6th, 10th, 17th, and 21st mayor of Kenosha, Wisconsin legislator
 Malcolm D. Farr, Wisconsin legislator
 Margaret Farrow, 42nd Lieutenant Governor of Wisconsin, University of Wisconsin Board of Regents
 Michael Frank, 1st mayor of Kenosha, Wisconsin legislator
 Myron L. Gordon, Wisconsin Supreme Court
 Levi Grant, Wisconsin legislator
 Orson S. Head, Wisconsin legislator and lawyer
 Daniel Hugunin Jr., U.S. Representative from New York
 Bob Kiss, mayor of Burlington, Vermont
 Joseph Lourigan, Wisconsin legislator
 Frederick S. Lovell, 11th Speaker of the Wisconsin State Assembly, Union Army general
 Silas Matteson, Wisconsin legislator
 John J. Maurer, Wisconsin legislator
 John G. McMynn, 7th Wisconsin Superintendent of Public Instruction
 George Molinaro, Wisconsin legislator
 Earl D. Morton, Wisconsin legislator and jurist
 George Howard Paul, 5th mayor of Kenosha, Wisconsin legislator, journalist
 Milton Pettit, 11th Lieutenant Governor of Wisconsin, 8th, 11th, 13th, and 16th mayor of Kenosha
 Charles H. Pfennig, Wisconsin legislator
 Mark Pocan, U.S. Representative
 Lewis W. Powell, Wisconsin legislator and lawyer
 Reince Priebus, former chairman of the Republican National Committee, former White House Chief of Staff
 Michael Pucci, Australian politician
 Joseph V. Quarles, U.S. Senator, U.S. District Judge, and former Kenosha mayor
 Clifford E. Randall, U.S. Representative
 Robert Schmidt, Wisconsin legislator
 Mathias J. Scholey, former Kenosha mayor
 Conrad Shearer, Wisconsin legislator
 Charles C. Sholes, former Kenosha mayor
 Rouse Simmons, Wisconsin legislator and businessman
 Zalmon G. Simmons, Wisconsin legislator, former Kenosha mayor, and businessman
 William H. Stevenson, U.S. Representative

Sports

 Milo Allison, MLB player
 Alan Ameche, Wisconsin Badgers and NFL football player, 1954 Heisman Trophy winner
 Donna Becker, All-American Girls Professional Baseball League ballplayer
 Ray Berres, MLB player, longtime Chicago White Sox pitching coach
 Tom Bienemann, NFL player
 Fred Borak, NFL player
 Dick Bosman, MLB pitcher and pitching coach
 Tom Braatz, NFL player and general manager
 Jeff Cohen, All-American basketball player at The College of William & Mary in 1960-61
 Frankie Conley, boxer
 Ed Corey, MLB player
 Fritz Cronin, NFL player
 Press Cruthers, MLB player
 Ben Dyer, MLB player
 Gene Englund, NBL, NBA basketball player, captain of University of Wisconsin's 1941 national championship team
 Barbara Galdonik, AAGPBL ballplayer
 Melvin Gordon, NFL player
 Harvey Green, MLB player
 Jack Hammond, MLB player
 Bob Hartman, MLB player
 Joyce Hill, All-American Girls Professional Baseball League player
 Ken Huxhold, NFL player
 Chuck Jaskwhich, head coach of the Ole Miss Rebels men's basketball team
 Chet Kozel, professional football player
 Gavin Lux, infielder for Los Angeles Dodgers
 Walter Maurer, Olympic wrestling medalist
 Marie Menheer, All-American Girls Professional Baseball League player
 Darlene Mickelsen, All-American Girls Professional Baseball League player
 Ollie O'Mara, MLB player
 Megan Oster, figure skater
 Charlie Pechous, MLB player
 Phil Pettey, NFL player
 Tom Regner, Notre Dame All-American offensive guard and 1966 Houston Oilers NFL Champion Team
 Elmer Rhenstrom, NFL player
 Ben Rothwell, professional mixed martial artist
 Paul Russo, auto racer
 Augie Schmidt, baseball player and coach
 Ray Spalding, NBA player
 Ralph Thomas, NFL player
 Nick Van Exel, NBA player and currently an assistant coach for the Atlanta Hawks
  James "Hippo" Vaughn, Chicago Cubs pitcher
 Trae Waynes, NFL player

Other

 Edward E. Ayer (1841–1927), railway supplies magnate; manuscript collector; benefactor to Newberry Library and Field Museum of Natural History
 Mary D. Bradford, educator, first female superintendent of a major school system in Wisconsin
 Bill Brown (1855–1941), Oregon rancher
 Jerry Golden, ABC reporter who was first with the John F. Kennedy assassination news
 Linda Ham, manager of the Johnson Space Center
 Michael P. Hammond, chairman, National Endowment for the Arts
 Jim Jensen, CBS news anchor and reporter
 Raymond Edward Johnson, radio actor, host of Inner Sanctum
 Samuel C. Johnson, Sr., founder, Johnson Wax
 Edward S. "Ned" Jordan, automaker (Jordan Motor Car Company), columnist ("Ned Jordan Speaks," AutoWeek) and ad writer ("Somewhere west of Laramie")
 Laura Kaeppeler, Miss Wisconsin 2011 and Miss America 2012
 Theodore H. Laban, highly decorated U.S. Army Air Forces soldier
 Lola J. May, mathematics educator
 Robert Bruce McCoy, United States National Guard officer
 Charles Francis McGivern, highly decorated U.S. Navy officer
 Joseph E. Meyer, herbologist and founder of the Indiana Botanic Gardens
 Charles W. Nash, automaker, Nash Motors, Nash-Kelvinator
 Edward T. Newell, president of the American Numismatic Society 1916–1941
 Norm Nielsen, magician and businessman
 James R. O'Neill, American Civil War correspondent and sketch artist
 Michael Phillips, theater critic, Pulitzer Prize jurist
 Peter Pirsch, builder of fire equipment
 Luther B. Scherer, also known as Tutor Scherer, (1879–1957), American investor in casinos in Las Vegas, Nevada and poet laureate of Nevada.
 Kendra Scott, jeweler
 Christopher Latham Sholes, publisher, inventor of the QWERTY keyboard
 Zalmon Gilbert Simmons II, businessman
 Charles Symmonds, U.S. Army general
 George Nelson Tremper, educator
 Paul Weyrich, founder of the Heritage Foundation and Free Congress Foundation; member of National Surface Transportation Policy and Revenue Study Commission
 Joseph Zimmermann, inventor of the answering machine

See also
 List of mayors of Kenosha, Wisconsin

References 

Kenosha, Wisconsin
Kenosha